Fortress Investment Group is an American investment management firm based in New York City. Fortress was founded as a private equity firm in 1998 by Wes Edens, Rob Kauffman, and Randal Nardone. When Fortress launched on the NYSE in February 2007, it was the first large private equity firm in the US to be traded publicly. In December 2017, Fortress was fully acquired by SoftBank Group, was delisted, and returned to being a privately held company. As of June 30, 2020, the firm manages approximately $45.5 billion alternative assets in private equity, liquid hedge funds and credit funds.

History

1998–2010
Fortress Investment Group LLC was founded as a private equity firm in 1998 by Wesley R. Edens, a former partner at BlackRock; Rob Kauffman, a managing director at UBS; and Randal A. Nardone, also a managing director at UBS. Based in New York City, Fortress quickly expanded into hedge funds, real estate-related investments and debt securities, run by Michael Novogratz and Pete Briger, both former partners at Goldman Sachs.

Fortress's investments grew rapidly, with its private equity funds netting 39.7% between 1999 and 2006. When Fortress launched on the NYSE on February 9, 2007 with Goldman Sachs and Lehman Brothers underwriting the IPO, it was the first large private equity firm in the United States to be traded publicly. In the wake of the economic downturn of 2008, Forbes included Wesley Edens (and two other Fortress principals) among its "biggest billionaire losers of 2008", noting that Edens had "watched his fortune dwindle as investor redemption soared at the company's flagship fund". Fortress and its principals were subsequently featured in an April 2009 Vanity Fair article on the adverse economic conditions facing hedge funds.

2010–present
In 2014, Fortress was named "Hedge Fund Manager of the Year" by Institutional Investor and "Management Firm of the Year" by HFMWeek. Fortress has previously been recognized by Institutional Investor as “Discretionary Macro-Focused Hedge Fund of the Year” for 2012, and “Credit-Focused Fund of the Year” for both 2011 and 2010. In Autumn 2014, Fortress hired Jeff Feig, formerly the Global Head of Foreign Exchange at Citigroup to join Novogratz as co-CIO of the Fortress Macro Fund. As of October 13, 2015, the company announced that the $2.3 billion Macro Fund was to close down and distribute its assets to investors. This development came after Feig stepped down as co-CIO of the fund in July 2015. According to the firm, Novogratz, the remaining CIO, was expected to retire from the firm by the end of 2015. As of June 30, 2016, Fortress Investment Group had four core businesses totaling approximately $70.2 billion of assets under management: private equity, credit, liquid markets and traditional asset management (Logan Circle Partners was acquired in April 2010).

On February 14, 2017, SoftBank Group agreed that it would buy Fortress Investment Group LLC for $3.3 billion. The SoftBank acquisition was completed in the last week of December, with Fortress being delisted from the New York Stock Exchange, and returned to being a privately held company.

In the wake of the Harvey Weinstein sexual assault scandal, in late October 2017, it was reported that Fortress Investment Group was in talks to provide a loan to Weinstein Co. In December 2017, Fortress Investment Group loaned $100 million to the medical startup Theranos. Theranos had reportedly been on the verge of bankruptcy, with the loan to keep them solvent through 2018. At the time, Fortress also had "underdog" bets in a private passenger rail line in Florida. By January 3, 2018 the company had divested itself of Florida East Coast Railway and Logan Circle Partners. It remained the parent company of the Brightline passenger rail in Florida, which is the only privately owned and operated passenger railroad in the United States. Fortress Investment Group is also investing in the construction of Brightline West, a high speed rail route between Las Vegas and Southern California. The route is being advertised as “A Brightline Company.” On January 3, 2018, it was reported that Fortress was nearing a deal to sell its stake on OneMain to Apollo Global Management. The agreement was announced on January 5, with Varde Partners also taking part in the purchase.

In 2020, Fortress Investment increased its bid for Japanese company Unizo to roughly $1.6 billion.

Portfolio companies
In 2006, Fortress-managed funds acquired Canadian ski resort operator Intrawest, North America's largest ski resort operator that also operated luxury adventure travel brands such as Abercrombie & Kent, which was sold in August, 2016.

In November 2006, RailAmerica announced that a Fortress-managed fund would acquire the company, offering $16.35 per share (a 32% premium). The transaction was completed in February 2007. Fortress later sold RailAmerica via initial public offering in October 2009.

In May 2007, Florida East Coast Industries (FECI), parent company of Florida East Coast Railway, announced that following a unanimous vote of the FECI Board of Directors, a Fortress-managed fund would acquire FECI in a transaction valued at $3.5 billion. The Surface Transportation Board approved the transaction in September 2007. Although RailAmerica operated FEC for a time, the two were never merged, and after the RailAmerica IPO Fortress retained FEC (and still does).

In June 2007, Fortress announced that it would partner with Centerbridge Partners to acquire Penn National Gaming, an operator of casinos and horse racing venues, for $6.1 billion. Penn National shareholders were to receive $67 cash for each share. In July 2008, Fortress backed away from the agreement amidst the uncertain economic climate. Under the termination agreement, Penn National received $1.475 billion, consisting of a breakup fee of $225 million and an interest-free $1.25 billion loan from Fortress, Centerbridge, Wachovia and Deutsche Bank. Fortress co-chairman Wesley Edens assumed a seat on the board of Penn National as part of the agreement.

Fortress has taken several of its portfolio companies public, such as Aircastle Ltd., Brookdale Senior Living Inc., GAGFAH and RailAmerica, Inc.

Fortress has said it lost $125 million purchasing fraudulent promissory notes from Marc Dreier, who had been operating a Ponzi scheme. Fortress filed a lawsuit against the law firm Dechert in an attempt to recover the loss. The lawsuit was filed in New York state court, alleging Dechert issued a "false" legal opinion letter that Dreier used to defraud Fortress.

Fortress's private equity investment portfolio includes Aircastle Limited, Alea Group Holdings (Bermuda) Ltd., AMRESCO, Boxclever, Capstead Mortgage Corporation, CW Financial Services, Eurocastle Investment Limited, Flagler, Florida East Coast Railway, GAGFAH, GateHouse Media, Inc., Global Signal, Inc., Green Tree Servicing LLC, Holiday Retirement, Intrawest, Italfondiario, Kramer Junction, Mapeley Limited, MBS Holdings, MS Hub, Nationstar Mortgage LLC, Penn National Gaming, Inc., Prime Retail, RailAmerica, RESG, Seacastle Inc., Simon Storage, Springleaf Financial, Umami Burger, and IPCom GmbH & Co. KG.

In January 2014, Fortress was the winning bidder for the assets of the Montreal, Maine and Atlantic Railway, a line bankrupted after the July 6, 2013 Lac-Mégantic derailment of a runaway train loaded with crude oil obliterated much of historic downtown Lac-Mégantic, Quebec, causing 47 fatalities. In March 2014, John E. Giles of Great Lakes Partners estimated a $10–$20 million investment would be needed over three years to repair the line, which Fortress brands as the Central Maine and Quebec Railway, as it is in poor condition and currently not safe for the transport of oil or dangerous goods. The sale was completed in May 2014, for US$15.85 million.

In October 2014, it was reported by the Birmingham Business Journal that Fortress had purchased the Inverness Corners retail center. Fortress Investment Group is also the parent company to Mystays hotels and resorts in Japan.

Controversies

Intrawest late payment & Olympic village funds
Fortress Investment Group was the primary lender to Millennium Development Group for building the C$875 million athlete's village for the 2010 Winter Olympics in Southeast False Creek, Vancouver, British Columbia. Financial instability in September 2008 saw Fortress Investment Group reportedly at the brink of bankruptcy; consequently, Fortress was unable to provide further financing to Millennium, forcing the City of Vancouver to pay approximately $450 million (CAD) to complete the project in time for the Winter Olympic Games. The City of Vancouver applied for and received legislative approval from the Province of BC to borrow as much money as required to enable the project to complete. The village was completed in November 2009. Three weeks before the opening of the 2010 Winter Olympics in Vancouver, Fortress failed to make payment on its loan used to buy out Intrawest. This caused its creditors to force Intrawest to divest itself of several of its resort holdings in 2009 and 2010 in order to reduce its debt load. Fortress Investment became the owner of the village after the 2010 Winter Olympics.

VLSI Technology LLC & INVT SPE LLC 
VLSI Technology LLC & INVT SPE LLC are non-operating subsidiaries of Fortress Investment that have filed several lawsuits against Apple, Intel, HTC, ZTE and other telecommunications companies. In 2019, VLSI Technology LLC alleged Intel's SpeedStep technology introduced in 2005 infringes on its patent purchased. INVT SPE LLC was assigned 740 telecommunications patents originally filed by Panasonic after Fortress Investment acquired Inventergy Global, Inc. and restructured it.

Labrador Diagnostics 
On March 9, 2020, Fortress Investment, through its non-operating subsidiary Labrador Diagnostics (which holds patents previously owned by Theranos), alleged that BioFire's FilmArray technology infringes upon some of its patents. However, on March 3, 2020, the Wall Street Journal published an article identifying that bioMérieux was working on two diagnostic tests for COVID-19. After the patent infringement lawsuit was filed, bioMérieux issued a press release announcing that BioFire was developing tests to detect SARS-CoV-2. After this announcement, Labrador issued a statement claiming that when it filed the lawsuit against BioFire it had no idea BioFire was developing COVID-19 testing kits. Fortress Investment Group subsequently offered to grant both the defendants and anyone else a royalty-free license for its technology for use in COVID-19 tests.

Key people
Randal A. Nardone: CEO, co-founder, principal
Wesley R. Edens: co-founder, principal
Peter L. Briger: principal

Board of directors
Wesley R. Edens: co-chairman
Peter L. Briger: co-chairman
Randal A. Nardone
David B. Barry
Douglas L. Jacobs
Michael G. Rantz
George W. Wellde, Jr.

See also
List of asset management firms 
List of hedge funds

References

External links
 

Companies formerly listed on the New York Stock Exchange
Investment management companies of the United States
Hedge funds
Hedge fund firms in New York City
Financial services companies established in 1998
1998 establishments in the United States
Private equity firms of the United States
SoftBank Group
2017 mergers and acquisitions
2007 initial public offerings